Longitarsus gracilis is a species of beetle in the subfamily Galerucinae that can be found in Asian counties like Turkey and Israel, and also in African ones such as Algeria and Morocco. Besides African and Asian countries it is widespread in Europe. It can be found in Central Europe (except for Romania), Yugoslavian states (except for North Macedonia), Baltic states, and Ukraine.

References

Beetles described in 1864
Beetles of North Africa
Beetles of Asia
Beetles of Europe
gracilis